Qiantang may refer to:

 Qiantang River in eastern China
 Qiantang, Chongqing, a town in Chongqing, China
 Qiantang, Guangdong, a town in Zhanjiang, Guangdong, China
 Qiantang District, a county-level city in Hangzhou, Zhejiang, China

Former places
 Hangzhou, a city on the Qiantang River in Zhejiang, China, formerly known as Qiantang County
 Hang Prefecture, a prefecture around modern Hangzhou, briefly known as Qiantang Prefecture during Wuyue (907–978)

See also
Qian Tang (born 1950), Assistant-Director General for Education at UNESCO